Chen Tong is a character featured within the famed classic Chinese novel Investiture of the Gods. 

Chen Tong is the commander of Highwater Pass and has remained so for a few years. Chen Tong personally seems to have a deep grudge against Prince Huang Feihu, for Huang attempted to execute Chen Tong after he had continuously performed crimes. Following the Huang escape arc, Huang would approach Chen Tong's Highwater Pass at one point in time and would only end up being wounded by one of his poisonous arrows. Commerce, one of four generals under Huang Feihu, would also be wounded by a poisoned arrow. Once Huang had been cured by Huang Tianhua during the time of night, Chen Tong would later appear and ask for battle. After realizing Huang's survival, Chen Tong would charge at him and duel it out. Once realizing his incapability in prowess, Chen would flee while unleashing his poisoned arrows at Huang. These arrows were ineffective this time, due to Huang Tianhua's abilities of negation. Thus, Huang Tianhua would unleash his Non-Evil sword, and Chen Tong would instantly fall from his horse, dead.

Chen Tong was appointed as the deity of Tianluo Star (天罗星).

Notes

References
 ''Investiture of the Gods chapter 31 - 32

Investiture of the Gods characters